Constituent Assembly elections were held in Portugal on 28 May 1911, following a coup in October 1910. The result was a victory for the Portuguese Republican Party, which won 229 of the 234 seats.

Electoral system
The country was divided into 51 constituencies for the election. Lisbon elected 20 members from two 10 member seats using proportional representation and the d'Hondt method, whilst Oporto had one 10 member constituency using the same system. The remaining seats were elected from 48 constituencies with three or four members.

Property qualifications for voters were abolished and suffrage was extended to all adults who were either literate or heads of their households, as well as soldiers, who had previously been barred from voting. Bankrupts and "vagabonds" were excluded from the electoral roll.

Candidates for the election had to be literate, and could not run in more than one seat. Party lists had to obtain a certain number of signatures in every constituency (100 in Lisbon and Oporto and 25 in other constituencies) in order to contest the election.

Parties
The table below lists the parties that contested the elections:

Results

Aftermath
The 1911 constitution was subsequently drawn up, which provided for a bicameral parliament and a president elected by a two-thirds vote in Parliament.

References

Legislative elections in Portugal
Portugal
1911 elections in Portugal
May 1911 events